Monte Tabor is a hill in Recanati, Marche, Italy. It is also called "the hill of infinity" because it is described as the site of a spiritual epiphany in Giacomo Leopardi's famous poem "L'infinito".

Coincidentally, it is named after Mount Tabor in Israel, believed by many Christians to be the site of another spiritual manifestation, the Transfiguration of Jesus.

Mountains of Marche
Giacomo Leopardi